The India women's national cricket team toured Bangladesh in March 2014. They played Bangladesh in three Twenty20 Internationals, winning the series 3–0. The tour preceded the 2014 ICC Women's World Twenty20, which both sides competed in and was also held in Bangladesh.

Squads

WT20I Series

1st T20I

2nd T20I

3rd T20I

See also
 2014 ICC Women's World Twenty20

References

External links
India Women tour of Bangladesh 2013/14 from Cricinfo

International cricket competitions in 2014
2014 in women's cricket
Women's international cricket tours of Bangladesh
India women's national cricket team tours
2014 in Bangladeshi women's sport
2014 in Bangladeshi cricket